Midnight Ride may refer to:

 Midnight Ride (film), a 1990 American action/thriller
 Midnight Ride (album), an album by Paul Revere & the Raiders
 Paul Revere's Midnight Ride in 1775 at the beginning of the Revolutionary war.

See also
 Midnight Rider (disambiguation)